Ron Waksman is a cardiologist. He is the Associate Director, Division of Cardiology, Washington Hospital Center (WHC) and professor of medicine (cardiology) at Georgetown University.

Areas of interest 

His current research interests include brachytherapy for restenosis prevention bioabsorbable/ biodegradable stents, HDL therapy, intracoronary imaging, valvular heart disease and catheter-based treatment of renal denervation. He is also the author/co-author of more than 20 book chapters and the editor/co-editor of six books in the field of cardiology. He serves as the Editor-in-Chief of the journal Cardiovascular Revascularization Medicine (Including Molecular Interventions).

Education 

Ron Waksman earned his medical degree from the Ben Gurion University in Israel and completed residencies in medicine, cardiology, and interventional cardiology at Hadassah University in Jerusalem, Israel. Subsequently Waksman completed his fellowship in interventional cardiology in 1994 at Emory University Hospital Midtown in Atlanta, GA under Spencer B. King, III.

Certifications
 Educational Commission for Foreign Medical Graduates
 Israeli Board in Internal Medicine	
 Israeli Board in Cardiology		
 Interventional Cardiology (Emory)
 American Board of Internal Medicine

Professional societies 
 Israel Cardiac Society
 American College of Cardiology (Fellow of the American College of Cardiology)
 Radiation Vascular Investigative Protocol Group
 The Society for Cardiac Angiography and Interventions Board of Trustees
 AHA Council on Atherosclerosis, Thrombosis and Vascular Biology

References

External links 
 Cardiovascular Research Institute homepage
 Cardiovascular Revascularization Medicine homepage
 Washington Hospital Center homepage
 Georgetown University School of Medicine homepage
 Cardiovascular Revascularization Medicine homepage
 Cardiovascular Research Technologies homepage
 Cardiovascular Research Technologies (CRT) meeting
 Educational Commission for Foreign Medical Graduates

American cardiologists
American medical academics
Year of birth missing (living people)
Living people
Ben-Gurion University of the Negev alumni
Fellows of the American College of Cardiology